1068 Nofretete, provisional designation , is a stony asteroid from the background population in the outer asteroid belt, approximately 23 kilometers in diameter. It was discovered on 13 September 1926, by Belgian astronomer Eugène Delporte at the Royal Observatory of Belgium in Uccle. The asteroid was named after the Ancient Egyptian Queen Nefertiti by its German name "Nofretete". The near-Earth asteroid 3199 Nefertiti is also named after her.

Orbit and classification 

Nofretete is a non-family asteroid from the main belt's background population. It orbits the Sun in the outer asteroid belt at a distance of 2.6–3.2 AU once every 4 years and 12 months (1,810 days; semi-major axis of 2.91 AU). Its orbit has an eccentricity of 0.10 and an inclination of 5° with respect to the ecliptic. The body's observation arc begins at Uccle in September 1926, three nights after its official discovery observation.

Physical characteristics 

Nofretete has been characterized as a stony S-type asteroid by American astronomer Richard Binzel.

Rotation period 

In May 1984, a rotational lightcurve of Nofretete was obtained from photometric observations by Richard Binzel which gave a rotation period of 6.15 hours with a low brightness amplitude of 0.04 magnitude, indicative for a nearly spheroidal shape.

Diameter and albedo 

According to the surveys carried out by the Japanese Akari satellite and the NEOWISE mission of NASA's Wide-field Infrared Survey Explorer, Nofretete measures between 21.346 and 26.73 kilometers in diameter and its surface has an albedo between 0.104 and 0.1832.

The Collaborative Asteroid Lightcurve Link assumes a standard albedo for stony asteroids of 0.20 and derives a diameter of 22.03 kilometers based on an absolute magnitude of 10.65.

Naming 

This minor planet was named by German astronomer Gustav Stracke after the Ancient Egyptian Queen Nefertiti (c.1370 – c.1330 BC) by its common German name "Nofretete". She was the wife of pharaoh Akhenaten (a.k.a. Echnaton or Amenhotep IV), after whom the asteroid 4847 Amenhotep is named. The official naming citation was mentioned in The Names of the Minor Planets by Paul Herget in 1955. The near-Earth asteroid 3199 Nefertiti, discovered by American astronomers Carolyn and Eugene Shoemaker at Palomar, was also named after her.

Notes

References

External links 
 Asteroid Lightcurve Database (LCDB), query form (info )
 Dictionary of Minor Planet Names, Google books
 Asteroids and comets rotation curves, CdR – Observatoire de Genève, Raoul Behrend
 Discovery Circumstances: Numbered Minor Planets (1)-(5000) – Minor Planet Center
 
 

001068
Discoveries by Eugène Joseph Delporte
Named minor planets
19260913